A berserker was a Norse warrior who fought with great rage.

Berserker or Berzerker may also refer to:

Books and comics
 Berserker (novel series), a space opera series by Fred Saberhagen
 Berserker (comics), a comic book series by Top Cow
 Berzerker (comics), a member of the Morlocks and the Tunnelers in books published by Marvel Comics
 Berserker (Fate/Zero), a character in the Japanese novel Fate/Zero by Gen Urobuchi
 Berserker Armor, a fictional body armor worn by Guts in the manga series Berserk

Film
 Berserker (1987 film), a slasher horror film
 Berserker (2004 film), a film based on the Norse concept of the berserker

Music
 Berserker (Amon Amarth album), a 2019 album by Swedish death metal band Amon Amarth
 Berserker (Beast in Black album), a 2017 album by Finnish-Greek-Hungarian heavy metal band Beast in Black
 Berserker (Gary Numan album), a 1984 album by Gary Numan
 Berserker (Jane album), a 2005 album by experimental group Jane
 Berserker (Scratch Acid album), a 1986 EP by noise rock band Scratch Acid
 "Berserker", a metal song by Love Among Freaks from the Clerks soundtrack
 The Berzerker, an Australian industrial death metal band
 "Berserkers" (Black Label Society song), a song by Black Label Society from their album 1919 Eternal

Other uses
 Berserker, Queensland, a suburb in Rockhampton, Queensland, Australia
 Berserker Range, a mountainous region on the boundary of Queensland
 Berserker probe, a hypothetical variant of the Von Neumann probe
 John Nord (born 1959), professional wrestler known as The Berzerker
 Four game pieces found in the Lewis chessmen, hoard

See also
Berserk (disambiguation)
 Zerker (disambiguation)